John Daniel Ehrlichman (March 20, 1925 – February 14, 1999) was an American political aide who served as the White House Counsel and Assistant to the President for Domestic Affairs under President Richard Nixon. Ehrlichman was an important influence on Nixon's domestic policy, coaching him on issues and enlisting his support for environmental initiatives.

Ehrlichman was a key figure in events leading to the Watergate break-in and the ensuing Watergate scandal, for which he was convicted of conspiracy, obstruction of justice, and perjury, and served a year and a half in prison.

Early life
Ehrlichman was born in Tacoma, Washington, the son of Lillian Catherine (née Danielson) and Rudolph Irwin Ehrlichman. His family practiced Christian Science (his father was a convert from Judaism). In 1931, the family moved to southern California. He was an Eagle Scout, recipient of the Distinguished Eagle Scout Award, graduated from Santa Monica High School in 1942, and attended the University of California, Los Angeles, for a year prior to his military service.

Military service and early career
At age 18 in 1943, he enlisted in the U.S. Army Air Forces.

In World War II, Ehrlichman received the Distinguished Flying Cross as a lead B-17 navigator in the Eighth Air Force. Earlier in the war, his father joined the Royal Canadian Air Force as an instructor pilot in 1940 and was killed in a crash in Torbay, Newfoundland (later Canada, from 1949) on May 6, 1942.

Taking advantage of the G.I. Bill, Ehrlichman returned to UCLA and graduated in 1948 with a B.A. in political science; he graduated from Stanford Law School in 1951.

After a short time back in southern California, Ehrlichman joined a Seattle law firm, becoming a partner, practicing as a land-use lawyer, noted for his expertise in urban land use and zoning. His uncle was president of the Municipal League, and Ehrlichman was active, supporting its efforts to clean up Lake Washington and to improve the civic infrastructure of Seattle and King County. He remained a practicing lawyer until 1969, when he entered politics full-time.

Political life

Ehrlichman worked on Nixon's unsuccessful 1960 presidential campaign and his unsuccessful 1962 California gubernatorial election campaign. He was an advance man for Nixon's 1968 presidential campaign.

Following Nixon's victory, Ehrlichman became the White House Counsel (John Dean would succeed him). Ehrlichman was Counsel for about a year before becoming Chief Domestic Advisor for Nixon. It was then that he became a member of Nixon's inner circle. He and close friend H. R. Haldeman, whom he had met at UCLA, were referred to jointly as "The Berlin Wall" by White House staffers because of their German-sounding family names, and their penchant for isolating Nixon from other advisors and anyone seeking an audience with him. Ehrlichman created "The Plumbers", the group at the center of the Watergate scandal, and appointed his assistant Egil Krogh to oversee its covert operations, focusing on stopping leaks of confidential information after the release of the Pentagon Papers in 1971.

Henry Paulson was John Ehrlichman's assistant in 1972 and 1973. Ehrlichman spoke with the hijackers of Southern Airways Flight 49 on November 10, 1972, via telephone.

After the start of the Watergate investigations in 1973, Ehrlichman lobbied for an intentional delay in the confirmation of L. Patrick Gray as Director of the FBI. He argued that the confirmation hearings were deflecting media attention from Watergate and that it would be better for Gray to be left "twisting, slowly, slowly in the wind."

White House Counsel John Dean cited the "Berlin Wall" of Ehrlichman and Haldeman as one of the reasons for his growing sense of alienation in the White House. This alienation led him to believe he was to become the Watergate scapegoat and then to his eventual cooperation with Watergate prosecutors. On April 30, 1973, Nixon fired Dean. Ehrlichman and Haldeman resigned.

Ehrlichman was defended by Andrew C. Hall during the Watergate trials, in which he was convicted of conspiracy, obstruction of justice, perjury, and other charges on January 1, 1975 (along with John N. Mitchell and Haldeman). All three men were initially sentenced to between two and a half and eight years in prison. In 1977, the sentences were commuted to one to four years. Unlike his co-defendants, Ehrlichman voluntarily entered prison before his appeals were exhausted. He was released from the Federal Correctional Institution, Safford, after serving a total of 18 months. Having been convicted of a felony, he was disbarred from the practice of law. Ehrlichman and Haldeman sought and were denied pardons by Nixon, although Nixon later regretted his decision not to grant them. Ehrlichman applied for a pardon from President Reagan in 1987.

Post-political life
Following his release from prison, Ehrlichman held a number of jobs, first for a quality control firm, then writer, artist and commentator. Ehrlichman wrote several novels, including The Company, which served as the basis for the 1977 television miniseries Washington: Behind Closed Doors. He served as the executive vice president of an Atlanta hazardous materials firm. In a 1981 interview, Ehrlichman referred to Nixon as a "very pathetic figure in American history." His experiences in the Nixon administration were published in his 1982 book, Witness To Power. The book portrays Nixon in a very negative light, and is considered to be the culmination of his frustration at not being pardoned by Nixon before his own 1974 resignation. Shortly before his death, Ehrlichman teamed with best-selling novelist Tom Clancy to write, produce, and co-host a three-hour Watergate documentary, John Ehrlichman: In the Eye of the Storm. The completed but never-broadcast documentary, along with associated papers and videotape elements (including an interview Ehrlichman did with Bob Woodward as part of the project), is housed at the Richard B. Russell Library for Political Research and Studies at the University of Georgia in Athens, Georgia.

In 1987, Dreyer's Grand Ice Cream hired Ehrlichman to do a television commercial for a light ice cream sold by the company, as part of a series of commercials featuring what the company called "unbelievable spokespeople for an unbelievable product." After complaints from consumers, the company quickly pulled the ad.

Ehrlichman died of complications from diabetes in Atlanta in 1999, after discontinuing dialysis treatments.

Drug war quote
In 2016, a quote from Ehrlichman was the lede for an anti-drug war article in Harper's Magazine by journalist Dan Baum.

Baum states that Ehrlichman offered this quote in a 1994 interview for Baum's 1996 book, Smoke and Mirrors: The War on Drugs and the Politics of Failure, but that he did not include it in that book or otherwise publish it for 22 years "because it did not fit the narrative style" of the book.

Multiple family members of Ehrlichman (who died in 1999) challenge the veracity of the quote:

In an expository piece focused on the quote, German Lopez does not address the family's assertion that the quote was fabricated by Baum, but suggests that Ehrlichman was either wrong or lying:

In the media

John Ehrlichman was portrayed by J. T. Walsh in the film Nixon, and by Wayne Péré in Mark Felt: The Man Who Brought Down the White House.

Fiction works
 The Company
 The Whole Truth
 The China Card

See also
 Modified limited hangout, a phrase Ehrlichman used in the Watergate tapes
 Operation Sandwedge

References

Further reading

External links

John Ehrlichman testifying at the Watergate Hearings WETA-TV Public Television, 1973 Watergate Hearings
John Ehrlichman's Secret White House Tapes at the Miller Center's Presidential Recordings Program
John Ehrlichman Believed Henry Kissinger was Deep Throat, an article from Editor & Publisher
The Testimony of John Ehrlichman & H. R. Haldeman at Smithsonian Folkways
Descriptive inventory of Eye of the Storm collection held at Richard B. Russell Library for Political Research and Studies
FBI file on John Ehrlichman
Federal Correctional Institute at Safford, Az, Federal Bureau of Prisons

|-

1925 births
1999 deaths
20th-century American lawyers
American Christian Scientists
American male non-fiction writers
20th-century American memoirists
United States Army Air Forces personnel of World War II
American people of Jewish descent
American perjurers
Deaths from diabetes
Drug policy of the United States
Washington (state) politicians convicted of crimes
Georgia (U.S. state) Republicans
Lawyers disbarred in the Watergate scandal
Military personnel from Tacoma, Washington
Nixon administration personnel
People convicted in the Watergate scandal
People convicted of obstruction of justice
Recipients of the Distinguished Flying Cross (United States)
Stanford Law School alumni
United States Army Air Forces officers
University of California, Los Angeles alumni
Washington (state) lawyers
Washington (state) Republicans
White House Counsels
Writers from Tacoma, Washington